Benedict may refer to:

People

Names
Benedict (given name), including a list of people with the given name
Benedict (surname), including a list of people with the surname

Religious figures

Pope Benedict I (died 579), head of the Catholic Church from 2 June 575 to his death in 579
Pope Benedict II (635–685), also a saint
Pope Benedict III (died 858), head of the Catholic Church from 29 September 855 to his death in 858
Pope Benedict IV (died 903), head of the Catholic Church from 1 February 900 to his death in 903
Pope Benedict V (died 965), head of the Catholic Church from 22 May to 23 June 964, in opposition to Pope Leo VIII
Pope Benedict VI (died 974), head of the Catholic Church from 19 January 973 to his death in 974
Pope Benedict VII (died 983), head of the Catholic Church from October 974 to his death in 983
Pope Benedict VIII (died 1024), head of the Catholic Church from 18 May 1012 to his death in 1024
Pope Benedict IX (c. 1010–1056), in Rome, was the head of the Catholic Church on three occasions between October 1032 and July 1048
Pope Benedict XI (1240–1304), head of the Catholic Church from 22 October 1303 to his death in 1304
Pope Benedict XII (c. 1280–1342), head of the Catholic Church from 20 December 1334 to his death in 1342. He was the third Avignon Pope
Pope Benedict XIII (1649–1730), later Friar Vincenzo Maria Orsini, O.P., was the head of the Catholic Church from 29 May 1724 to his death in 1730
Pope Benedict XIV (1675–1758), head of the Catholic Church from 17 August 1740 to his death in 1758
Pope Benedict XV (1854–1922), head of the Catholic Church from 3 September 1914 to his death in 1922
Pope Benedict XVI (1927–2022), head of the Catholic Church from 19 April 2005 until his resignation in 2013
Antipope Benedict X (c. 1000–c. 1070), son of Guido (the youngest son of Alberic III, Count of Tusculum), a brother of the notorious Pope Benedict IX (deposed in 1048), a member of the dominant political dynasty in the region at that time
Antipope Benedict XIII (1328–1423), known as el Papa Luna in Spanish, was an Aragonese nobleman, who is officially considered by the Catholic Church to be an antipope
Antipope Benedict XIV, the name used by two closely related minor antipopes of the 15th century

Places
Benedict Canyon, Los Angeles, an area in Los Angeles County, California
Benedict (crater), a lunar crater
Benedict Fjord, Greenland
Benedict Glacier, Canada
Benedict, Georgia, U.S.
Benedict, Kansas, U.S.
Benedict, Maryland, U.S.
Benedict, Minnesota, U.S.
Benedict, Nebraska, U.S.
Benedict, North Dakota, U.S.
Benedikt, Slovenia, Slovenia

Other uses
Benedict College, South Carolina, United States
Benedict International Education Group, a Swiss group with 80 schools worldwide

See also

Saint Benedict (disambiguation)
São Bento (disambiguation)
St Benet (disambiguation)
Benediction, a short invocation for divine help
Order of Saint Benedict, a Roman Catholic religious order 
Benedictine (disambiguation)
Eggs Benedict, a food dish
Benedict's reagent, a test for aldehydes in chemistry